Tobi 13 - Coptic Calendar - Tobi 15

The fourteenth day of the Coptic month of Tobi, the fifth month of the Coptic year. On a common year, this day corresponds to January 9, of the Julian Calendar, and January 22, of the Gregorian Calendar. This day falls in the Coptic Season of Shemu, the season of the Harvest.

Commemorations

Saints 

 The martyrdom of Saint Mohrael 
 The departure of Saint Archlides the Monk 
 The departure of Saint Maximus, the brother of Saint Dometius

References 

Days of the Coptic calendar